Dolores Borisova Arsenova (born May 7, 1964) is a former Member of the Bulgarian Parliament and leader of the National Movement for Stability and Progress, formerly known as the National Movement Simeon II (NMSII), which is a liberal political party in Bulgaria. She has Jewish descent. She served in the cabinet of Tsar Simeon II of Bulgaria as his Minister of Environment and Waters.

Personal background 
Arsenova was born in the small village of Belimel in Bulgaria.

Educational background
In 1990, Arsenova graduated with a teaching degree from St. Clement of Ohrid University of Sofia, Bulgaria. In 1995, she received her law degree from the University for National and World Economics (UNWE) in Sofia, Bulgaria.

Professional background 
In 1996, Arsenova began working in law, becoming a member of the Sofia Bar Association. Her focus included providing legal advice and serving as a management consultant working with nonprofit organizations. In 1999, she was honored with a fellowship of the Global and Regional Development Section at the Sociology Institute with the Bulgarian Academy of Sciences.

On July 24, 2001, Arsenova set her legal career aside, when she became a Member of Parliament and was appointed as the Minister of Environment and Waters in the cabinet of Tsar Simeon II of Bulgaria, with the Government of the National Movement Simeon II.

Arsenova is member of the Bulgarian Sociology Association and of the Union of Scientists in Bulgaria. She is also the chair of the Governing Board of the Hypokrat Nonprofit Association.

Media appearances 
Arsenova drew the attention of the IRS and the journalists on Nova Television's "Tax the rich struck from the air", which was broadcast on October 1, 2010.

Docetaxel cancer medicine 
In February 2010, Arsenova and her husband came under scrutiny when they were accused of fraud by purchasing Docetaxel chemotherapy medication, in India and selling it with a surcharge three times higher to Bulgaria's health ministry. According to the accusation Arsenova's company, Biomars Ltd., took a profit of approximately US$980 per bottle of the medication.

Cancer patients and patients rights advocates claimed that the inflated prices of the medicine resulted in a drastic shortage of medication for oncology diseases, causing decreasing health and/or death for cancer patients throughout the country.

On February 26, Arsenova appeared on the morning broadcast of "This Morning", on bTV channel. Her appearance caused controversy, when she failed to clear her name or that of her husband, simply stating, "It is a lie that the company of my husband has siphoned off the state budget." She refused to disclose the price at which the medicine was purchased in India, claiming that the financial transaction was confidential.

References 

Bulgarian politicians
Living people
1964 births